The 1936 Cincinnati Bearcats football team was an American football team that represented the University of Cincinnati as a member of the Buckeye Athletic Association during the 1936 college football season. In their second season under head coach Russ Cohen, the Bearcats compiled a 1–5–3 record.

Schedule

References

Cincinnati
Cincinnati Bearcats football seasons
Cincinnati Bearcats football